Silent Movies are 13 solo guitar compositions by Marc Ribot released September 28, 2010 on Pi Recordings.

Reception

The album received universal acclaim, with Metacritic giving it a score of 87% from 7 reviews. The AllMusic review by Thom Jurek awarded the album 4 stars, stating, "For those interested in one of the more compelling and quietly provocative and graceful guitar records of 2010, Silent Movies is well worth seeking out". PopMatters correspondent Will Layman said, "Marc Ribot really ought to have the opportunity to score films more often, because the results can be breathtaking". Rolling Stone'''s Will Hermes observed, "he indulges the yearning melodic sensibility that hides hooks in even his noisiest recordings, and increasingly defines his playing".

Track listingAll compositions by Marc Ribot, aside from track 13 written by Hubert Giraud''.
 "Variation 1" – 1:51
 "Delancey Waltz" – 3:18
 "Flicker" – 5:22
 "Empty" – 2:04
 "Natalia in E-Flat Major" – 5:16
 "Solaris" – 3:47
 "Requiem for a Revolution" – 5:31
 "Fat Man Blues" – 4:49
 "Bateau" – 4:59
 "Radio" – 4:05
 "Postcards from N.Y." – 8:31
 "The Kid" – 4:16
 "Sous le Ciel de Paris" – 6:46

Personnel
Marc Ribot – guitar
JD Foster -  producer

References

Marc Ribot albums
2010 albums
Pi Recordings albums